The 2012 World Thoroughbred Rankings was the 2012 edition of the World Thoroughbred Rankings. It was an assessment of Thoroughbred racehorses issued by the International Federation of Horseracing Authorities (IFHA) in January 2012. It included horses aged three or older which competed in flat races during 2011. It was open to all horses irrespective of where they raced or were trained.

Rankings for 2012
 For a detailed guide to this table, see below.

Guide
A complete guide to the main table above.

References

World Thoroughbred Racehorse Rankings
World Thoroughbred Rankings 2012